The Tuttle-Folsom House is a historic house in Manti, Utah. It was built in 1850, and later acquired by Luther T. Tuttle, the mayor of Manti who was also " a leading merchant, banker, livestock raiser and
served four terms as a territorial legislator." From 1880 to 1890, it belonged to architect William Harrison Folsom, who designed the Manti Utah Temple among many other buildings, followed by John C. Witbeck and John E. Metcalf. It has been listed on the National Register of Historic Places since July 21, 1977.

It has an early stone saltbox-type addition, with same cornice detail as in the original portion of the house.  There is only a minor break in the roofline, but an obvious break in the stonework of the abutting walls, with just a few interlocking stones.

It is located at 195 W. 300 North, at the southeast corner of N. 200 West.  A large addition was added on the north side of the house in 2012.

References

	
National Register of Historic Places in Sanpete County, Utah
Houses completed in 1850
1850 establishments in Utah Territory
Saltbox architecture in Utah